The Mad Game is a 1933 American Pre-Code crime drama film starring Spencer Tracy and Claire Trevor.

Plot
The film concerns an imprisoned bootlegger (Spencer Tracy) recruited from incarceration to help capture his own gang after they kidnap the daughter of the judge who jailed him. The movie was directed by Irving Cummings.

Cast
 Spencer Tracy as Edward Carson
 Claire Trevor as Jane Lee
 Ralph Morgan as Judge Penfield
 Howard Lally as Thomas Penfield
 J. Carrol Naish as Chopper Allen
 John Miljan as William Bennett
 Matt McHugh as Butts McGee
 Kathleen Burke as Marilyn Kirk
 Mary Mason as Lila Penfield
 Willard Robertson as Warden
 John Davidson as Doctor
 Paul Fix as Lou

External links
 
 
 

1933 films
1933 crime drama films
Fox Film films
American crime drama films
American black-and-white films
Films directed by Irving Cummings
Films produced by William Fox
1930s American films
1930s English-language films